Damenakademies or Ladies Academies were painting and drawing schools for women in Germany. Until the 20th century, it was difficult for women to take up an artistic profession. They were usually denied access to the academies. While in Russia, women were able to study at the academies as early as 1871, however in Germany, it was not possible until the beginning of the Weimar Republic. Apart from the private studios of individual artists, there were only three large educational institutions available to women, and these only offered a limited range of courses.

History 
The art academy in Germany, which was usually on a par with the universities and mostly later renamed to the "Academy of Fine Arts", filled a large gap in the artistic education system. However, this was only of importance for male interested parties: women were denied admission until well into the 20th century. They lacked an institution comparable to the academy.

Although there was already a timid admission for women before, this was associated with restrictions and special regulations: Women were not allowed to attend nude drawing and anatomy courses, for example. For many artistically ambitious women, the solution lay in expensive public schools. While men could receive academic instruction even without a pecuniary background, women's education was dependent on not inconsiderable financial resources from the very beginning. Selection was thus not based on talent but on ability to pay, which only damaged the reputation of talented women even more. There was no lack of influx of women interested in art and the public schools proved to be a lucrative business.

In the course of the numerous feminist movement foundations of the 19th century triggered by the Frauenverein, numerous women artists joined forces to improve the women at German universities also in the field of visual arts. On their own initiative, the women artists' associations founded so-called "Damenakademien" or "Malerinnenschulen", which enabled women to study art in a manner similar to that at the Kunstakademie. Explicitly worth mentioning here are the "Damenakademie in Berlin" and the "Damenakademie in Munich". It was only with the legal  (equality) of men and women in 1919 that women were admitted to the academies. The Karlsruhe Malerinnenschule for women painters was an exception. This was a private art school with state sponsorship.

Damenakademie Berlin 
The admission of women to the institutions of academic art education was an important step in the Emancipation. While "female elevens" could study at the "Königlich Akademische Hochschule für ausübende Tonkunst" since its foundation by Joseph Joachim in 1869, women remained excluded from the Universität der Künste Berlin until the German Revolution of 1918-1919, i.e. until the end of the Kaiserreich. Women who wanted to train as painters or sculptors had to turn to public schools.

The Verein der Berliner Künstlerinnen und Kunstfreundinnen" founded its own art school in 1868, which later also included a "Drawing and Painting School" with an attached "Drawing Teachers' Seminar", where, among others, Käthe Kollwitz worked as a teacher and Paula Modersohn-Becker studied with Jeanna Bauck. The women artists who founded the association in 1867 were primarily concerned with "the promotion and support of all women artists belonging to the association. This also included the establishment of various teaching matters, both for the artists' own further education and at the same time for the capable training of pupils with a passion for art." In 1879, a pension fund was also set up to provide women artists with a pension. The exclusion of women from the Art Academy in Berlin was highly controversial in the first decade of the 20th century. The Hochschule für die bildenden Künste under its director Anton von Werner came under considerable pressure; demands for the admission of women to study were raised loudly. In 1904, a group of ladies, among them Käthe Kollwitz, Sabine Lepsius and Julie Wolfthorn, addressed a petition to the academy director. These and other petitions, which found support in the Preußisches Abgeordnetenhaus and in the press, forced the academy to take a stand on the issue of women's studies. However, the position of both the lecturers and the male students remained immovable. It was not until spring 1919 that the first women began their studies.

Damenakademie München 
No women were admitted to study at the Akademie der Bildenden Künste München from 1852 to 1920. Around 1900, Munich was both a city of art and a centre of the women's movement. In addition to the goal of helping women gain civic and social rights, one of the central aims was to improve educational opportunities. Among other things, access to universities was demanded, which was finally possible in the Kingdom of Bavaria from 1903. However, women with the desire to become artists fought in vain for a long time for access to the Royal Academy of Fine Arts, which was only granted to them from 1919. Zofia Stryjeńska tried to circumvent this ban and enrolled in 1911 under her brother's name. Disguised as a man, she studied for a year before the deception was exposed and she had to leave the academy. Aspiring female artists could now only receive an artistic education at expensive public schools or the newly founded training centres, such as the "Damenakademie". The Königliche Kunstgewerbeschule München, founded in 1868, already granted women training in 1872, at least in its "female department", with studies to become drawing teachers.

Following the principle of collective support groups, women artists joined together, all of whom had experienced the inadequate educational situation for women, especially in the field of high art. Among the founding members were Jeanna Bauck (1840-1926) Bertha von Tarnóczy (1846-1936), Clementine von Braunmühl (1833-1918), Sophie Dahn-Fries (1835-1898),  (1846-1907), Olga Weiß (1835-1898) and Martha Giese (1860-1923). Two years later in 1884 they opened the Munich "Ladies Academy", which was organised on the model of the Royal Academy of Fine Arts. The house at Barer Straße 21 had five large studio windows on the garden side, and they offered training in figure and nude drawing, Lessons in perspective, painting technique, art history, anatomy, plus several electives such as head drawing, composition theory, still life and animal painting. In addition, the "Ladies' Academy" worked in summer with the landscape class in Seebruck on Lake Chiemsee. The students were taught by professors from the Munich Academy, among others, which earned the "Ladies' Academy" a good reputation. From 1894 onwards, the school was subsidised by the state, which led to an expansion of the school and the range of classes offered.

The "Damenakademie" was soon widely known and a centre of attraction for numerous young women from Germany and abroad who wanted to receive artistic training. In 1906, 427 students "from all over the world" attended the school. In addition to Gabriele Münter and Maria Marc, for example, Käthe Kollwitz also enrolled there. The students of the "School for Women Painters" were taught by Munich artists who also taught at the art academy or privately. For example, Angelo Jank, Ludwig von Herterich, Tina Blau, Maximilian Dasio, Max Feldbauer, Friedrich Fehr, Ludwig Herterich, Adolf Höfer, Angelo Jank, Georg Jauss, Lothar von Kunowski, Christian Landenberger, Franz Marc, Ludwig Schmid-Reutte, Albert Weisgerber and Marie Schnür, Johanna Tecklenborg, who was temporarily in charge of the association, and Heinrich Waderé.

From the beginning, women were allowed to attend this reform-oriented institution and the attendance was correspondingly high. From 1905, women were finally also able to attend the "Staatliche Fachakademie für Fotodesign München" and quickly achieved success with their work there.

With the opening of the Akademie der Bildenden Künste München to women from 1920, the "Damenakademie" was finally dissolved.

Malerinnenschule Karlsruhe 
Karlsruhe had become a centre of attraction for artists, especially since the foundation of the Staatliche Akademie der Bildenden Künste Karlsruhe in 1854 by Grandherzog Friedrich I, and developed into an up-and-coming art city. Judging by the coverage in the regional newspapers, women interested in art could take lessons in private painting schools, which prompted numerous women to come to Karlsruhe for art. The demand for professional training was enormous and teachers at the academy no longer accepted private female students, so that in 1885, by uniting private ladies' classes, a private art school set up especially for women, the "Malerinnenschule Karlsruhe" was founded, which was run as a private institution, subsidised by both the city and the state. On 1 October 1885, the School for Women Painters was opened under the patronage of Luise von Preußen. The school existed until 1923.

Großherzoglich Sächsische Kunstschule Weimar 
An der Grand-Ducal Saxon Art School, Weimar In 1902, the painter and director Hans Olde obtained admission for women to study. However, they were not granted an academic degree.

Teaching and experimental institute for photography 
When it was founded on 15 October 1900 in Rennbahnstraße near Munich's Theresienwiese, the Staatliche Fachakademie für Fotodesign München initially admitted only male candidates to study at the photography institute. In a progressive policy, Georg Heinrich Emmerich admitted women to his courses in 1905. Wanda von Debschitz-Kunowski and Sophie Reynier were among the 1905/1906 intake and Elfriede Reichelt, Charlotte Poehlmann and Amalie Schroer the following year. Due to female students' objections to the conditions of the uncomfortable dormitory, the school moved to a former hospital building in 1909, where it was vacant, and opened in May 1911. Enrolment of both sexes was subject to quotas, so that only ten female students were allowed per semester, a ratio of 1: 3. During the war years, the majority of female students increased to 3: 2 and reached a more balanced ratio in the 1920s. 1925, als Lotte Jacobi sich einschrieb, war die Hälfte der 51 eingeschriebenen Studenten Frauen, und 80% stammten aus nicht deutschsprachige Länder.

A primary school certificate was required for admission (although flexible during the war; Germaine Krulls lack of a school certificate was overlooked), and men had to be at least 15 years old and women at least 17, and all had to meet the annual certificate school fee of about 200 Reichsmark, which middle-class parents could afford, while even the wealthy working-class family might not be able to do so.

See also 
 Women artists

References

Further reading 
 Yvette Deseyve: Der Künstlerinnen-Verein München e.V. und seine Damenakademie. Eine Studie zur Ausbildungssituation von Künstlerinnen im späten 19. und frühen 20. Jahrhundert (Kunstwissenschaften. Bd. 12). Herbert Utz Verlag, Munich 2005,  (Zugleich: Munich, Univ., Magisterarbeit, 2002/03), mit einer Aufstellung aller ordentlichen Mitglieder, Schülerinnen und Lehrkräfte sowie Unterrichtsfächer in den Jahren 1882–1920.
 Anne-Kathrin Herber: Frauen an deutschen Kunstakademien im 20. Jahrhundert. Ausbildungsmöglichkeiten für Künstlerinnen ab 1919 unter besonderer Berücksichtigung der süddeutschen Kunstakademien, (Dissertation) Heidelberg, 2009.
 Carola Muysers: Die bildende Künstlerin. Wertung und Wandel in deutschen Quellentexten, 1855–1945, Dresden 1999.
 Brigitte Kerchner: Beruf und Geschlecht: Frauenberufsverbände in Deutschland 1848–1908, Vandenhoeck & Ruprecht, Göttingen, 1992, .
 Antonia Voit: Ab nach München – Künstlerinnen um 1900, Süddeutsche Zeitung Edition, 2014, .

External links 
 Ab nach München! Künstlerinnen um 1900, Bayerisches Fernsehen, 4 November 2014, retrieved 18 September 2021

Art schools in Germany
Arts in Berlin
Arts in Munich